Mintlaw railway station was a railway station in Mintlaw, Aberdeenshire.

History
The 29 mile long railway from Dyce to Mintlaw opened on 18 July 1861, with the extension to Peterhead opening the following year. This station opened as Old Deer and Mintlaw. The station building was on the westbound platform and the goods yard was on the south side. Two signal boxes opened in 1888: the north box, which was at the east end of the westbound platform and the south box, which was to the west of the eastbound platform. The north box closed in 1927 and the south box closed in 1959, being replaced by a ground frame. Passenger services on the Buchan lines were withdrawn on 3 May 1965 as part of the Beeching cuts. Freight trains continued to operate to Peterhead until 1970. The track through Maud station was subsequently lifted and the route now forms part of the Formartine and Buchan Way. The station building and the platforms remain.

References

External links 
 Mintlaw station on navigable 1949 O. S. map

Disused railway stations in Aberdeenshire
Beeching closures in Scotland
Former Great North of Scotland Railway stations
Railway stations in Great Britain opened in 1861
Railway stations in Great Britain closed in 1965
1861 establishments in Scotland
1965 disestablishments in Scotland